American singer Amerie has released four studio albums, two compilation albums, one mixtape, three extended plays, and fifteen singles. Her debut album, All I Have (2002), was certified Gold in the United States, and produced the top forty song "Why Don't We Fall in Love". Amerie's 2005 single "1 Thing"—from her second album, Touch became her biggest hit in the US and elsewhere, although US sales of Touch did not match those of her debut. Her third album, Because I Love It (2007), was preceded by the single "Take Control" and the mixtape Because I Love It Vol. 1, and it remains unreleased in North America. Amerie's recordings outside her solo material include featured credits on singles by Nas, LL Cool J, DJ Kayslay, Ricky Martin and Chingy.

Amerie's fourth album In Love & War debuted at number #46 on the US Billboard 200 chart, selling 12,500 copies in its first week. Three singles were released in promotion of the album, including "Why R U" on June 15, 2009, "Heard 'Em All" on September 15, 2009, and "Pretty Brown" on October 20, 2009. Def Jam released a six-track album sampler containing snippets of "Higher", "Tell Me You Love Me", "Pretty Brown", and "Red Eye", as well full versions of "Heard 'Em All" and "Why R U", which had been remastered. Amerie performed "Heard 'Em All" and "Higher" in November 2009 on Jimmy Kimmel Live!. A music video for "More Than Love" featuring Fabolous, directed by Taj was released in January 2010.

Albums

Studio albums

Compilation albums

Box sets

Mixtapes
2006: Because I Love It Vol. 1

Extended plays

Singles

As lead artist

As featured artist

Guest appearances

Music videos

Notes

References

Discographies of American artists
Contemporary R&B discographies